The 2016 season was Surrey Stars' first season, in which they competed in the Women's Cricket Super League, a Twenty20 competition. The side finished fourth in the group stage, winning two of their five matches.

The side was based in South London, and was partnered with Surrey County Cricket Club. They played one home match at The Oval and one at Woodbridge Road, Guildford. Surrey Stars' coach was Richard Bedbrook, and they were captained by Nat Sciver.

Squad
Surrey Stars' 15-player squad is listed below. Meg Lanning and Kirstie White were originally named in the squad, but were both ruled out due to injury and replaced by Lea Tahuhu and Naomi Dattani, respectively. Age given is at the start of Surrey Stars' first match of the season (31 July 2016).

Women's Cricket Super League

Season standings

 Advanced to the Final.
 Advanced to the Semi-final.

League stage

Statistics

Batting

Bowling

Fielding

Wicket-keeping

References

Surrey Stars seasons
2016 in English women's cricket